The tsunami fish is the surviving specimen of five striped beakfish that lived for more than two years in the partially submerged hull of the Japanese boat Sai-shou-maru (斎勝丸), after the boat broke loose and went adrift during the 2011 Tōhoku earthquake and tsunami. The fish now lives in the Seaside Aquarium in Seaside, Oregon.

Tsunami and voyage
The Tōhoku earthquake occurred on March 11, 2011, and was the most powerful reliably measured earthquake in Japanese history. The resulting tsunami swept the  Sai-shou-maru out to sea and inundated its storage compartments with seawater containing marine life, including several beakfish larvae. During the ensuing two year drift across the Pacific Ocean, the fish matured into juveniles. Scientists speculate that the fish were deposited into the ghost ship by sea waves either off the coast of Japan or Hawaii.

Discovery
The boat was discovered beached on the Washington coast on March 22, 2013, its internal hold now forming an "aquarium" for the five beakfish as well as more than 30 plant and invertebrate species. Four were euthanized shortly after their discovery by the Washington Department of Fish and Wildlife, due to concerns that the warm-water fish could be an invasive species. The fifth was brought to the city hall in a bucket, after which the Seaside Aquarium agreed to add the fish to their collection. As of late 2013, the fish is on display at the aquarium.

References

External links
Boat found with live fish inside confirmed to be Japan tsunami debris, Washington State Department of Ecology

2011 Tōhoku earthquake and tsunami
2013 in Washington (state)
Individual fish
Seaside, Oregon
Individual animals in the United States